Micromyini is a tribe of wood midges, insects in the family Cecidomyiidae. There are about 9 genera and at least 30 described species in Micromyini.

Genera
These nine genera belong to the tribe Micromyini:
 Anodontoceras
 Aprionus i c g
 Bryomyia i c g
 Micromya i c g
 Monardia Kieffer, 1895 i c g b
 Mycophila i c g
 Polyardis i c g
 Strobliella Kieffer, 1898 i c g
 Trichopteromyia i c g
 Xylopriona i c g
Data sources: i = ITIS, c = Catalogue of Life, g = GBIF, b = Bugguide.net

References

Further reading

 
 
 
 
 

Cecidomyiidae
Articles created by Qbugbot
Nematocera tribes